The Spanish Dancer is a 1923 American silent costume epic starring Pola Negri as a gypsy fortune teller, Antonio Moreno as a romantic count, and Wallace Beery as the king of Spain. The film was directed by Herbert Brenon and also features a five-year-old Anne Shirley, appearing under the name "Dawn O'Day."  The film survives today.

The film is essentially the same story as Mary Pickford's Rosita which was filmed around the same time as The Spanish Dancer with Negri's old colleague from Germany Ernst Lubitsch directing. Negri's The Spanish Dancer was considered the better film.

Plot
As described in a film magazine review, Maritana, a beautiful Spanish young woman, is so full of life and fun that she is adored by the poor people among whom she lives and who dote on her dancing in the public squares. Through her daring, she and her sweetheart Don Cesar de Bazan become involved in the affairs of the Spanish court, and he with his life is to pay the supreme penalty. Using her feminine charms and her artful wiles, she not only saves him but wins a respected place for herself.

Cast

Preservation
The Spanish Dancer was restored by the EYE Film Institute in the Netherlands, and the film was shown at the National Gallery of Art in Washington D.C. on August 5, 2012, accompanied by the 1916 Lois Weber film Shoes.

References

External links

 (nonrestored version)
The Spanish Dancer: being a translation from the original French by Henry L. Williams of Don Caesar de Bazan, New York: Grosset & Dunlap, Pola Negri edition with illustrations from the Paramount film; on the Internet Archive

1923 films
Films directed by Herbert Brenon
Films set in the 17th century
Romantic epic films
American silent feature films
Films set in Spain
1923 romantic drama films
American romantic drama films
Films based on works by Victor Hugo
American black-and-white films
1920s historical romance films
American historical romance films
Paramount Pictures films
American epic films
1920s English-language films
1920s American films
Silent romantic drama films
Silent adventure films
Silent American drama films
Silent historical romance films